Sushila Singh also known as Shilu Singh was the first female justice of the Supreme Court of Nepal. On 22 May 2020, Singh died at the age of 81.

See also
 Sushila Karki

References

External links
 Supreme Court of Nepal

Justices of the Supreme Court of Nepal
2020 deaths